SuperFabric is a cut and abrasion resistant material, and a registered trademark of Higher Dimension Materials, Inc.  As a technical fabric, SuperFabric is created with a base fabric such as nylon, polyester, neoprene, crepe, etc. and is overlaid with tiny, hard guard plates in a specific pattern.  Spacings between the guard plates allow a degree of flexibility, breathability and are small enough to keep most sharp objects from penetrating.  This guard plate technology protects the base fabric and contributes to the durability of the material.  The geometry, thickness, and size of the guard plates, as well as the base fabric, vary depending on industry requirements.  Customized and optional properties include flame resistance and specialized grip.

Properties

Cut resistance

SuperFabric materials have tiny raised guard plates to deflect sharp objects that would otherwise tear the underlying base fabric. These guard plates are advertised to act as a protective barrier contributing to the overall longevity of the material by reducing the likelihood that a sharp object will damage the fibers.

Abrasion resistance
 
SuperFabric's manufacturer claims that its guard plates provide a flexible armor that resists abrasion and protects the underlying base fabric

Puncture resistance
 
Specific SuperFabric materials are designed to protect against surgical and hypodermic needles.

Additional properties 

Fire resistance can be achieved by selection of resin and base fabric during manufacturing.

The process used to make SuperFabric materials allows customization of surface properties with additional coatings such as silicone to improve grip on smooth surfaces such as metal, glass, and laminate.

Most SuperFabric materials are highly resistant to stains. Many stains bead up on the surface of SuperFabric, which can make for easy cleaning, while retaining their protective and durable properties.

Applications 

There is a wide range of applications for SuperFabric:

 Technical outdoor apparel
 Military, law enforcement
 Commercial food-processing protection
 Industrial safety and protection
 Motorcycle apparel and accessories
 Heavy-duty diving suit protection (U.S. Coast Guard, etc.)
 Cleaning products (scrub pads, etc.)
 Vehicle seats and accessories

References

External links 
 SuperFabric Homepage

Technical fabrics
Safety clothing
Motorcycle apparel